Jegi or JEGI may refer to:

 Jegi, an item used in the Korean game of Jegichagi
 Jegi-dong, a neighborhood of Seoul, Korea